Cythara thapsiae is a species of sea snail, a marine gastropod mollusk in the family Mangeliidae.

This species is considered a nomen dubium.

Description

Distribution
This marine species was found off Sicily, Italy.

References

 Oberling, Jean-Jacques. Quelques especes nouvelles de Gastéropodes du bassin Méditerranéen. Naturhistorisches Museum, 1970.

External links
  Tucker, J.K. 2004 Catalog of recent and fossil turrids (Mollusca: Gastropoda). Zootaxa 682: 1–1295.

thapsiae
Gastropods described in 1970